All Saints Monastery is an Orthodox Christian Monastery in Dewdney, British Columbia, Canada. It was founded in 1968. After visiting Mount Athos in 1968, Lev Puhalo and Vasili Novakshonoff came up with the idea of building an Orthodox Monastery in Canada. Since both men already had experience of the monastic life, they decided to attempt the foundation of a monastic house and aid in the advancement of a Canadian Orthodox reality

See also
 Westminster Abbey (British Columbia)
 List of places of worship in the Lower Mainland

External links
 Official website

Eastern Orthodox monasteries in Canada
20th-century Christian monasteries
Religious buildings and structures in British Columbia
Lower Mainland
Christianity in British Columbia
1968 establishments in British Columbia
20th-century religious buildings and structures in Canada